Banka Lok Sabha constituency is one of the 40 Lok Sabha constituencies in Bihar state in eastern India. This comprises the Banka district.

Vidhan Sabha segments
Presently, Banka Lok Sabha constituency comprises the following six Vidhan Sabha (legislative assembly) segments:

Members of Lok Sabha
The following is the list of the Members of Parliament elected from this constituency

^ by-poll

Election results

2019 Lok Sabha

2009 Lok Sabha
 Digvijay Singh (IND) : 185,762 votes
 Jai Prakash Narayan (RJD) : 157,046

2010 Bye-poll

2004 Lok Sabha
 Giridhari Yadav (RJD) : 339,880 votes
 Digvijay Singh (JD-U) : 335,211

1986 by-election
The 1986 bye-election was held for the Banka seat. The election was won by the INC candidate Manorama Singh with 186237 votes, against George Fernandes of Janata Party with 156853 votes.

Notes

References

External links 
Banka lok sabha  constituency election 2019 date and schedule

Politics of Banka district
Lok Sabha constituencies in Bihar
Politics of Bhagalpur district